Pedro III  may refer to:
Pedro III of Aragon (1239–1285)
Pedro III of Kongo (fl. 1669–1680)
 Pedro III of Portugal (1717–1786)

See also
Peter III (disambiguation)